New South Wales Horse Artillery in Action was a short documentary film.

Marius Sestier made two films of the New South Wales Horse Artillery drill at Victoria Barracks, Sydney.

Sestier together with Henry Walter Barnett had made approximately 19 films in Sydney and Melbourne between October and November 1896, these being the very first films recorded in Australia.

References

External links

1890s Australian films
1896 films
Australian silent short films
Australian black-and-white films
1896 short films
1890s short documentary films
Films shot in Sydney